Raimundo Martínez Soto (born 25 November 1999) is a Chilean rugby union player, who plays for Selknam.

Club career 
Martínez grew up in Santiago, where he played his rugby with the PWCC, before enjoying a spell in the CA Brive academy from 2019 to 2020.

Back in Chile, he played with Selknam in the newly founded Súper Liga Americana de Rugby. He was part of the team that registered historical wins against the Argentinian Jaguares XV, eventually reaching the final of the competition.

International career 
Raimundo Martínez is a Chile international since 2018, as Los Cóndores had some historical results in Test matches, beating the likes of recent world cup qualified Russia in 2021.

He was part of the team that qualified for their first Rugby World Cup in 2022, upsetting the odds against Canada and the United States, a serie of historic wins that sealed their qualification for the 2023 World Cup.

References

External links

1999 births
Sportspeople from Santiago
Living people
Chilean rugby union players
Chile international rugby union players
Rugby union hookers
Rugby union flankers
Rugby union number eights
Selknam (rugby union) players